Saimaan Pallo (SaiPa) is an ice hockey team in the Finnish Liiga. They play their home games at Kisapuisto in Lappeenranta, Finland.
SaiPa has many nicknames, such as "The Sputniks", "Sputnik", "miracle of the East" and "East giant."

SaiPa play home games in the yellow shirt, black pants, yellow socks, and a black helmet. 
SaiPa play away games in mostly the same costumes as the home games, but also have a black version of the jersey.

History
The team's best achievement is from the 1965-1966 season, when they won bronze medals for placing third. SaiPa also played in a bronze medal game in the 1998–1999 and 2013–14 seasons, but lost the games to HPK (7–2) and Lukko (3–2).

SaiPa has participated twice in the Champions Hockey League. During the 2014-2015 season, the team survived the quarterfinals, where they lost the return match against Oulun Kärpät. During the 2016–17 season, SaiPa won their initial games by 11 points. Eisbären Berlin and Luleå HF were the runners-up.

SaiPa has produced seven players who have played in the National Hockey League (NHL): Antti Aalto, Jussi Markkanen, Petteri Nokelainen, Petri Skriko, Jussi Timonen, Vesa Viitakoski, and Niklas Bäckström. Jussi Markkanen is also a part owner of the club.

Honours

Domestic
SM-sarja
  3rd place (1): 1965–66

Pre-season
Finnish Cup
  Runners-up (3): 1958, 1965, 1971

Players

Current roster

Retired numbers

NHL alumni

 Antti Aalto
 Niklas Bäckström
 Frank Banham
 Richard Lintner
 Jussi Markkanen
 Dale McTavish
 Jarmo Myllys
 Petteri Nokelainen
 Antti Pihlström
 Martin Richter
 Petri Skriko
 Jussi Timonen
 Shayne Toporowski
 Vesa Viitakoski

References

External links
SaiPa official website 
SaiPa Fan Club 
Idän Ihme fan site 

Sport in Lappeenranta
Liiga teams
1948 establishments in Finland
Liiga